May 2014

See also

References

 05
May 2014 events in the United States